Lists of corporate acquisitions and mergers include both takeovers and mergers of corporations. Most are organized by the main company involved in the transactions.

By industry

 List of airline mergers and acquisitions
 List of bank mergers in the United States
 List of mergers and acquisitions in online gambling
 List of mergers of securities firms

Company specific

List of acquisitions by company
 List of acquisitions by Adobe
 List of acquisitions by American Bridge Company
 List of acquisitions by AOL
 List of acquisitions by CA Technologies
 List of acquisitions by Cisco Systems
 List of acquisitions by Dell
 List of acquisitions by Disney
 List of acquisitions by eBay
 List of acquisitions by Electronic Arts
 List of acquisitions by Hewlett-Packard
 List of acquisitions by Juniper Networks
 List of acquisitions by Nokia
 List of acquisitions by Oracle
 List of acquisitions by Sony
 List of acquisitions by Take-Two Interactive
 List of acquisitions by THQ Nordic

List of mergers and  acquisitions by company
 List of mergers and acquisitions by Advania
 List of mergers and acquisitions by Alphabet
 List of mergers and acquisitions by Amazon
 List of mergers and acquisitions by Apple
 List of mergers and acquisitions by BlackBerry
 List of mergers and acquisitions by Citrix
 List of mergers and acquisitions by Dell
 List of mergers and acquisitions by Embracer Group
 List of mergers and acquisitions by IBM
 List of mergers and acquisitions by Meta Platforms
 List of mergers and acquisitions by Microsoft
 List of mergers and acquisitions by NortonLifeLock
 List of mergers and acquisitions by Salesforce
 List of mergers and acquisitions by Symantec
 List of mergers and acquisitions by Twitter
 List of mergers and acquisitions by Yahoo!

Other
 List of companies consolidated into American Bridge Company

Lists of companies